Oswald William 'Lofty' Herman (18 September 1907 – 24 June 1987) was an English first-class cricketer who played for Hampshire. He was the father of cricketer Bob Herman.

Herman was a tall right arm paceman who bowled in-swingers. He took over 100 wickets in a county season on five occasions with his best effort coming in 1937 when he managed 142 wickets at 22.07.

External links
CricketArchive

1907 births
1987 deaths
English cricketers
Hampshire cricketers
English cricket umpires
Wiltshire cricketers
Players cricketers
English cricketers of 1919 to 1945
Oxfordshire cricketers